Cramling is a surname. Notable people with the surname include:

 Anna Cramling (born 2002), Swedish chess player
 Pia Cramling (born 1963), Swedish chess player